TanDEM-X (TerraSAR-X add-on for Digital Elevation Measurement) is the name of TerraSAR-X's twin satellite, a German Earth observation satellite using SAR (Synthetic Aperture Radar) - a modern radar imaging technology.  Implemented in a Public-Private-Partnership between the German Aerospace centre (DLR) and EADS Astrium (now Airbus Defence and Space), it is a second, almost identical spacecraft to TerraSAR-X. TanDEM-X is also the name of the satellite mission flying the two satellites in a closely controlled formation with typical distances between 250 and 500 m. The twin satellite constellation allowed the generation of WorldDEM global digital elevation models starting in 2014.

Mission
The primary mission objective is the generation of WorldDEM,  a consistent global Digital Elevation Model (DEM) with an unprecedented accuracy according to better than DTED Level 2 specifications. WorldDEM resolution will correspond to DTED Level 3 (post spacing of better than 12 meters) and a height accuracy of better than 2m  (relative)- a standard not yet defined. Digital Elevation Models of posting better than DTED Level 2 are often called HRTI (High Resolution Terrain Information) DEM.

WorldDEM 
WorldDEM is a highly accurate, detailed and consistent DEM of the Earth's entire land surface, acquired and generated within three years after launch. Available from 2014, WorldDEM is to feature a vertical accuracy of 2m (relative) and 4m (absolute), within a horizontal raster of approximately 12x12 square meters, slightly varying depending on the geographic latitude. Infoterra GmbH, a 100% subsidiary of Astrium, holds the exclusive commercial marketing rights for the WorldDEM and is responsible for the adaptation of the elevation model to the needs of commercial users worldwide. When the system launched, accuracy over forested areas was unknown.

First 3D Image 
Researchers at the German Aerospace Center facility in Oberpfaffenhofen published the first 3D images from the TanDEM-X satellite mission.  A group of Russian islands of the Severnaya Zemlya group in the Arctic Ocean was selected for the first test.

References

External links

TanDEM-X at DLR website.
TanDEM-X  at Infoterra GmbH website.
TanDEM-X Science Home at DLR website

Earth observation satellites
Space synthetic aperture radar
Spacecraft launched in 2010
Spacecraft launched by Dnepr rockets
Satellites of Germany
Twin satellites